2005 Burundian elections may refer to:
28 February 2005 — 2005 Burundian constitutional referendum
3 June and 7 June 2005 — 2005 Burundian communal elections
4 July 2005 — 2005 Burundian legislative election
29 July 2005 — 2005 Burundian Senate election
19 August 2005 — 2005 Burundian presidential election